Lafayette College is a private liberal arts college in Easton, Pennsylvania. Founded in 1826 by James Madison Porter and other citizens in Easton, the college first held classes in 1832.  The founders voted to name the college after General Lafayette, a hero of the American Revolution.

Lafayette College guarantees campus housing to all enrolled students. The college requires students to live in campus housing unless approved for residing in private off-campus housing or at home as a commuter.

The student body, consisting entirely of undergraduates, comes from 46 U.S. states and territories and nearly 60 countries. Students at Lafayette have access to more than 250 clubs and organizations, including athletics, fraternities and sororities, special interest groups, community service clubs, and honor societies.

History

Founding

A group of Easton, Pennsylvania residents, led by James Madison Porter (son of General Andrew Porter of Norristown, Pennsylvania), met on December 27, 1824, at White's Tavern to discuss founding a college in town.  The recent visit of General Lafayette to New York during his grand tour of the US in 1824 and 1825 prompted the founders to name the college after the renowned French military officer, a hero of the American Revolutionary War, as "a testimony of respect for [his] talents, virtues, and signal services... in the great cause of freedom".

The group established a 35-member board of trustees, a system of governance that continues at the college to the present.  They selected Porter, lawyer Jacob Wagener, and Yale-educated lawyer Joel Jones to come up with an education plan.  The charter gained state approval from the legislature and, on March 9, 1826, Pennsylvania Governor John Andrew Shulze. Along with establishing Lafayette as a liberal arts college, the charter provided for religious equality among professors, students, and staff.

The board of trustees met on May 15, 1826, for the election of officers: Thomas McKeen as Treasurer, Joel Jones as Secretary, and James Madison Porter as the first president of the college. Over the next few years, the board met several times to discuss property and funding for the college's start-up. Six years after the first meeting, Lafayette began to enroll students.

The college opened on May 1, 1829, with four students under the guidance of Rev. John Monteith. At the start of the next year, the Rev. George Junkin, a Presbyterian minister, was elected first official president of the college. He moved the all-male Manual Labor Academy of Pennsylvania from Germantown (near Philadelphia) to Easton. Its first two professors were Charles F. McCay and James I. Coon. Classes began on May 9, 1832, with instruction of 43 students in a rented farmhouse on the south bank of the Lehigh River. Junkin supported colonization of Liberia by ex-slaves from the United States. He proposed Lafayette for educating free African Americans for missionary work in the new American colony established by the American Colonization Society. Between 1832 and 1844, ten black students were enrolled at Lafayette, four of whom later served as missionaries in Liberia. Most African Americans, however, wanted to gain their legal rights in the United States, which, for many, had been their homeland for generations.

During the college's first years, students were required to work in the fields and workshops to allow the college to earn money to support its programs.  This manual labor was retained as part of the curriculum until 1839, as the college was focused on preparing students for Military and Civil Engineering. Later that year, Lafayette purchased property on what is now known as "College Hill" – nine acres of elevated land across Bushkill Creek.  The college's first building was constructed two years later on the current site of South College.

A dispute between Porter and Rev. Junkin led to the latter man's resignation from the presidency in 1841. The trustees considered the possibility of religious affiliation to achieve financial stability for the college.

In 1854, Lafayette College became affiliated with the Presbyterian Church. By relinquishing their control, the college was able to collect $1000 a year from the Presbyterian Church Board of Education as regularly as the latter could pay it. In the time from 1855 to 1856, Lafayette had a peak enrollment of 112 students in total. The class of 1857, a close-knit group of 27 men, worked in secrecy to establish charters in national fraternities, thus founding the first Greek fraternities at Lafayette College. These fraternities remained secret until 1915, as they were discouraged by the authorities as divisive of group unity.

World War I
In preparation for United States entry into the Great War, which had involved European nations from 1914, Lafayette announced that current students would be awarded their degrees in absentia if they enlisted or went to work on farms to support the war effort. Professor Beverly Kunkel organized The Lafayette Ambulance United, Section 61, United States Army Ambulance Corps.  During the summer of 1917, Dr. MacCracken arranged to adapt the campus as a war camp for the War Department.  Men trained to serve in mechanical trades.  Lafayette remained a war camp until January 2, 1919, when the regular course of study was re-established there.

Lafayette during the Great Depression

Between 1930 and 1934, during the Great Depression, the number of students declined dramatically.  The college created new scholarships and scholarship loans to enable more students to attend.  It also founded an Engineering Guidance Conference for boys. The conference was two weeks long and introduced twenty-one high school students to the concepts of engineering. This program continued until the outbreak of World War II in 1941. Though the college faced its own deficits during the Depression, it aided the larger community by offering a series of free classes to unemployed men, beginning in 1932. They also made athletic facilities available for free to unemployed members of the community. Enrollment began to rise again for the 1935–1936 academic year.

Decade of Progress campaign
As the college moved out of the Great Depression, the college's new president, William Mather Lewis, began what was called the Decade of Progress capital campaign, in order to fund delayed improvements. It started as a celebration of the 70th anniversary of Lafayette's engineering program.  President Lewis regarded this 70-year span as a period which "covers the great development in American engineering which has now seemed to reach its peak." The goal of this campaign was to raise $500,000 for payments on Gates Hall, renovation of Van Wickle Memorial Library, and equipment upgrades in other departments. By the time the campaign closed in 1944, the college had received a total amount of $280,853.34.

World War II
Initially, most of the faculty and students at Lafayette wanted the U.S. to stay out of the conflict in Europe. When President Franklin D. Roosevelt addressed the Pan-American Congress, saying that the US had a duty to protect Americans' science, culture, freedom and civilization, thirty-seven Lafayette faculty members wired the president objecting to his speech. After the Japanese attack on Pearl Harbor and declaration of war by the US, the Northampton County Council of Defense organized a College Council of Defense at Lafayette. The college took official action as well. It bolstered its ROTC program and improved facilities to prepare for air raid tests. The college continued its academic programs until the US lowered the draft age from 20 to 18 in November 1942. While more students enlisted, Lafayette College was one of 36 academic institutions selected by the War Department to train engineering and aviation cadets. After the war, the Serviceman's Readjustment Act of 1944 (known as the GI Bill) resulted in a new wave of enrollment at Lafayette by veterans: in 1949 the college had approximately 2000 students.

Coeducational institution
In 1967, in consideration of cultural changes that included women seeking more participation in society, faculty requested that a special committee be formed to discuss making Lafayette a co-educational institution. That committee issued a formal recommendation the following year. In September 1970, Lafayette College welcomed its first official coeducational class with 146 women (123 freshmen, and 23 transfers).

21st century
In 2004, a report on religious life at Lafayette College was compiled, recommending a review of the college's formal relationship with the Presbyterian church. The college has retained its affiliation, although it is not a member of the Association of Presbyterian Colleges and Universities.

In 2007, the college commemorated the 250th birthday of General Lafayette through a series of lectures and campus dedications. Major festivities were held on September 6, 2007, Lafayette's birthday. They were started the night before with a lecture by renowned historian David McCullough. On March 9, Lafayette commemorated approval of the college charter by the Pennsylvania Legislature with a campus-wide and alumni toast around the world.

On January 16, 2013, Dr. Alison R. Byerly was announced as Lafayette's 17th and first female president. She took office on July 1, 2013, replacing outgoing president Daniel Weiss. She was formerly a professor at Middlebury College.

In the mid-2010s, the college began to undertake plans for expansion of the student body to 2,900 students and the construction of new dorms and academic buildings, with the stated goal of raising funds for financial aid.

Nicole Hurd, the founder of the College Advising Corps, was announced as Byerly's successor as president on May 15, 2021.

Academics

Lafayette College offers a Bachelor of Arts (B.A.) degree in 37 fields. Lafayette also offers 14 Bachelor of Science (B.S.) degrees, 10 in areas of science and four in fields of engineering. Its most popular majors, by 2021 graduates, were:
Economics (81)
Mechanical Engineering (60)
Neuroscience (39)
Political Science & Government (38)
Chemical Engineering (35)
Psychology (34)
Civil Engineering (32)
International Relations & Affairs (32)

Lafayette College offers engineering programs within its liberal arts setting. The engineering programs offer five concentrations: chemical, civil, electrical & computer, mechanical, and engineering studies. In 2012, 94% of Lafayette's candidates (currently enrolled) passed the Fundamentals of Engineering Examination. This is the first requirement toward getting a professional engineering license. The national average varies from 70 to 87%, depending on the type of engineering.

Lafayette's team was undefeated in the academic College Bowl in 1962, retiring after beating the University of California, Berkeley for its fifth victory. In recent years, Lafayette College students earned numerous national and international scholarships, For the class of 2012, Lafayette gave financial aid to 66% of the students, with the average package amounting to $26,850 for all students.

The college also offers merit-based academic scholarships: the Marquis Fellowship, a full-tuition scholarship, and the Marquis Scholarship, a half-tuition scholarship.  Lafayette's endowment is more than $830 million, with total assets amounting to nearly $1.2 billion.

Rankings and reputation

Admissions 

Note: The SAT range for the Class of 2021 is based on a highest score of 1600, in accordance with the new SAT.

Campus

Lafayette College occupies College Hill in Easton, Pennsylvania, located in the Lehigh Valley. Its 340-acre campus houses 69 buildings, comprising approximately 1.76 million square feet. This includes a 230-acre athletic campus. Lafayette's campus buildings range in architectural style from Pardee Hall's Second Empire design and Hogg Hall's Collegiate Gothic, to the late modern architecture of the Williams Center for the Arts, the William E. and Carol G. Simon Wing of Skillman Library, and the Farinon College Center.

Academic facilities

Williams Center for the Arts is the college's performing arts center. Completed in 1983, the building houses the Performance Series, the Williams Art Gallery and College Collections, the College Theater program, the departments of Art and Music, and the student-led Arts Society. The centerpiece of the Williams Center is the 400-seat theater/concert hall and also contains a versatile art gallery, a 100-seat black box theater, and classrooms and studios for music and art.

Pardee Hall, funded by Ario Pardee and completed in 1873, is one of the earliest buildings constructed at Lafayette College. When initially constructed, it was one of the largest academic buildings of its era. Pardee was designed to hold all of the science programs. Today it is used for most of Lafayette's humanities and social science departments.

The Kirby Hall of Civil Rights was constructed in the late 1920s between the First World War and the Great Depression. The cost of the building was donated by Kirby. The design was "rumored to be per square foot the most expensive building of its day." Lafayette selected the architectural firm Warren and Wetmore, known for their projects of designing the New York Yacht Club, the New York Biltmore Hotel, and Grand Central Station. The building's exterior embraces styles of Republic Rome, the Renaissance, 17th English classicism, and Beaux-Arts. The interior lobby area contains broad staircases and is constructed of travertine marble. The building currently houses the Government and Law department. Students have access to the Kirby library, which has 20-foot ceilings and oak-paneled book cases. 

Markle Hall, now the main administrative building, holding Offices of Admissions and Financial Aid, was designed as the Hall of Mining Engineering. The college's Special Collections maintains an online historical overview of all the campus buildings.

The David Bishop Skillman library, built in 1961, is the main library on campus; the Simon Wing was added in 1986, and a $22 million renovation and expansion was completed in 2004.
 The library contains over 500,000 volumes in its collections and subscribes to thousands of magazines, journals, and newspapers in the electronic and paper format. In addition, the college's Special Collections and College Archives holds materials and displays holdings related to the Marquis de Lafayette. Reading and study areas and computer labs are available to the students.

East Asia Image Collection 
The East Asia Image Collection (EAIC) is an open-access digital repository of images from all areas of the history of the Empire of Japan. It is curated by the Digital Scholarship Services of Lafayette College. Rare materials include prewar picture postcards, high-quality commercial prints, and colonial era picture books.

Housing and student life facilities

Lafayette College guarantees campus housing to all enrolled students. The school requires students to live in campus housing unless approved for residing in private off-campus housing, or at home as a commuter. The college offers on-campus housing options, including traditional halls, Greek chapter houses, suite-style halls, and group living units. Some halls are single gender, while others may be co-ed by floor, wing, room, or suite. In addition, Lafayette College provides specialty housings that ties to specific academic departments, student organizations, or religious affiliations. Other residences include the McKelvy House, the Arts Houses, the Hispanic Society of Lafayette, and the Hillel House.

Lafayette College offers a variety of dining options for campus residents. Farinon College Center houses two of the main dining halls on campus. The top floor of Farinon is an "all-you-can-eat" style buffet, while ground level is a food court. Marquis Hall, the second-largest dining hall on campus, is the second dining hall with an "all-you-can-eat" style buffet. Marquis also houses regularly themed events and contests. Gilbert's Cafe, a coffeehouse located on the ground floor of Kirby House, was opened in 1999 to provide a late-night hangout and food for students. Simon's, a sandwich shop, is located in the ground floor of Kamine, a residence hall. The Skillman Café, located in the Skillman Library, sells Starbucks coffee and fresh-baked items made by the college. Lafayette also maintains an off-campus organic farm, LaFarm, which provides vegetables to the dining halls and employment for interested students.

Athletics

The Lafayette Leopards compete in the Patriot League under the guidance of current Athletic Director Sherryta Freeman. Lafayette offers students participation in 23 NCAA Division I sports, 18 club sports, and over 30 intramural sports.  Student-athletes are considered students first, and athletes second.  Lafayette currently ranks third nationally in student-athlete graduation success rate, according to the most recent NCAA study.

In 1896, Lafayette was the first non-Ivy League school to win a national football championship.  It was the first to use the "huddle", and the head harness, precursor to the football helmet.

The men's basketball program also has a decorated history. It had achievements peaking in the late 1990s under the leadership of Fran O'Hanlon, who led the Leopards to back-to-back Patriot League championships and NCAA Tournament appearances in 1999 and 2000. These seasons were documented by John Feinstein in his book, The Last Amateurs (2001).

 Affiliation: NCAA Division I, Football: Football Championship Subdivision
 Conference: Patriot League
 Team name: Leopards
 Team colors: Maroon and white
 Arch rival: Lehigh University
 Other rivals: Bucknell University, Colgate University, Princeton University
 Facilities: Fisher Stadium (football), Kirby Sports Center (basketball), Metzgar Fields Athletic Complex

Varsity sports

Men's sports
 Baseball
 Basketball
 Cross Country
 Football
 Golf
 Lacrosse
 Soccer
 Swimming & Diving
 Tennis
 Track & Field, Indoor
 Track & Field, Outdoor

Women's sports
 Basketball
 Cross Country
 Field Hockey
 Lacrosse
 Soccer
 Softball
 Swimming & Diving
 Tennis
 Track & Field, Indoor
 Track & Field, Outdoor
 Volleyball
 Cheerleading

Co-ed sports
 Fencing

Chief rivalry (Lafayette-Lehigh)

Lafayette College's athletic program is notable for "The Rivalry" with nearby Lehigh University.  Since 1884, the two football teams have met 150 times. This rivalry has had the most games in the history of American college football. It is also one of the oldest (when including high school or secondary school contests). It is also the longest-running rivalry in college football, with the teams playing at least once every year since 1897.  The Rivalry is considered to be one of the best in college athletics by ESPNU. It recently ranked as #8 among the Top Ten College Football Rivalries.

Lafayette leads the all-time series 79–71–5. In the most recent contest, on November 23, 2019, Lafayette defeated Lehigh by a score of 17–16.

Student life

Students at Lafayette are involved in over 200 clubs and organizations including athletics, fraternities and sororities, special interest groups, community service clubs and honor societies. The Lafayette College Student Government, consisting of 40 representatives, selected by 12 elected students, is responsible for chartering and supporting most of the student organizations on campus, and is responsible for allocating their budgets to allow these clubs to create programming and events for the campus community. Student Government collaborates with different administrative bodies on campus to improve the community, and is one component of the shared governance model with the faculty, administration, and Board of Trustees, which operates in order to best meet the needs of the students.

Greek life
Lafayette College has a Greek community. Though students are not eligible to join these organizations until sophomore year, approximately 39% of eligible students join the school's fraternities and sororities. All but two of the Greek organizations at Lafayette are located on campus, making it a viable living option. Additionally, members of each house commit themselves to various philanthropic ventures throughout the academic year as these groups work together with the college, local, and national affiliates to help achieve the goals and ideals their organizations were founded upon.

Fraternities

Sororities

In addition to the social fraternities and sororities, there are also a number of academic honor societies on campus.

Academic honor societies

Newspaper
The Lafayette, Lafayette's weekly student newspaper, was founded in 1870 and is the oldest college newspaper in Pennsylvania. It is available in both print and online form. Published every Friday during the academic year, print editions can be found around campus. All articles printed will also be available to read online and are uploaded every Friday. The newspaper has been published continuously since its creation, with the exception of during World War II, when operations were suspended between fall 1943 and March 1945. Over 4,200 digitized issues of The Lafayette are available online. The newsroom is located in the Farinon College Center.

Campus radio
The college radio station, which was founded in 1946, is WJRH and broadcasts to the campus and greater Lehigh Valley area at 104.9FM.

Student government 
Lafayette College Student Government is composed of four executive members (president, vice president, treasurer, and secretary), the board of directors, and committee members. With approximately 60 members, the student government covers a wide range of topics. Each committee has one elected director and three to seven committee members that are chosen through an application process and vetted by the elected members.

Alpha Phi Omega
Alpha Phi Omega, an international co-educational service fraternity, was founded at Lafayette in 1925 by Frank Reed Horton in Hogg Hall. The chapter regained its charter in 2018 after the efforts of student leaders, and maintains a mission to provide service work on campus and in the Easton community.

Investment club 
Founded in 1946, it is the oldest student-run investment club in the country. The club made national news in 2016, when CNN profiled their investment skills that led to returns of over 175 times their initial investment over 70 years (from $3,000 in 1946 to $530,000 in 2016), thereby beating the S&P 500 Index. As of March 2016, the portfolio contains 41 stocks.

Engineers Without Borders

The club was founded in 2003 and is a member of EWB-USA. Members of the club represent many disciplines in engineering and the liberal arts.  The club is linked with rural villages in the Yoro region of Honduras. EWB's mission is to design and implement projects in these villages that help promote better life.  The club has focused its efforts on water treatment systems.

El Convento, which is located in the Yoro district of central Honduras, will be the third sustainable water project EWB-LC students have worked on in the country since 2003 when the club was founded. The group has implemented gravity-fed water systems in neighboring Lagunitas and La Fortuna.  In La Fortuna, the group utilized a slow sand filter in its system. The group's previous work garnered national media exposure for being one of six national institutions to receive a $75,000 grant from the U.S. Environmental Protection Agency.

Volunteer opportunities

Landis Center
The Landis Center, Lafayette College's community outreach program, provides students with service opportunities.

Alternative School Break
Another volunteering alternative to the aforementioned Engineers Without Borders and Landis is Alternative School Break (ASB). Students travel in teams during the January interim or spring break and help communities build homes, paint, and tutor. Recent destinations have included the Dominican Republic, Ecuador, New Orleans, Chicago, and New York City. Students raise money through various fundraising events to mitigate the cost of the trip.

Lafayette Activities Forum
The Lafayette Activities Forum is a student-run organization to "promote campus interaction and student relations by incorporating programs and entertainment that reflect the interests of the general student body". LAF is made up of five committees: Class Year Experience, Culture, Media, & Entertainment, Traditions, Music & Coffeehouse, and Marketing. They are in charge of planning events such the Spring Concert, Fall Fest, the Spot Underground, Open Mic nights, and Live Comedy.

Notable people

Notable alumni of Lafayette College include CEOs Ian Murray (Vineyard Vines) and Chip Bergh (Levi Strauss & Co.), author Jay Parini, major league baseball manager Joe Maddon, and politicians William E. Simon (Secretary of the Treasury), John W. Griggs (Attorney General), and Marcia Bernicat (U.S. Ambassador to Bangladesh). Additionally, Lafayette counts among its alumni two Nobel Laureates (Philip S. Hench, Haldan K. Hartline), two billionaires, one MacArthur Fellow, and dozens of prominent bankers, judges, and scientists.

Notable alumni 

Since the college's establishment in 1826, and in conformity with the changing role of higher education in the U.S., the occupations of its graduates have shifted greatly from mainly clergymen, to rail road engineers, to lawyers, and then in the early-mid 20th century to the more diversified roles across the occupational spectrum seen presently. A non-exhaustive list of alumni achievements known to be deserving of recognition is as follows:

In government: Seventeen United States Congressmen, six governors, more than fifty members of state legislatures, four members of the President's cabinet, four ambassadors of the United States, countless diplomats, judges, mayors, and local government officials

In business: Several executives have attended including Captains of Industry at the turn of the century such as the founding members or directors of Carnegie Steel, Dow Jones & Company, and Woolworth's. In more recent times, graduates have held executive positions at a variety of Fortune 500 companies including ExxonMobil, Asbury Automotive Group, Morgan Stanley, Citigroup, Merrill Lynch and Goldman Sachs.

In technology: Sarkis Acopian, inventor of the solar radio; William C. Lowe, supervisor of the team that launched the first IBM PC; Don Lancaster (class of 1961) author of numerous electronic books including TTL Cookbook and CMOS Cookbook

In academia: James McKeen Cattell, the first professor of psychology in the United States; Frank Reed Horton, founder of the Alpha Phi Omega service fraternity; Steven Kuehl, Professor of marine geology; Barry Wellman, founder of the International Network for Social Network Analysis

In literature: Stephen Crane, author of The Red Badge of Courage; Jay Parini, professor and a leading innovator in biographical fiction; Ross Gay, poet and professor; Kameisha Jerae Hodge, writer, editor, and poet

In medicine: Two Nobel Prize winners, Philip S. Hench and Haldan K. Hartline

In military: Two four-star generals, Peyton C. March and George H. Decker, and two three-star generals, Edgar Jadwin and Stuart Risch

In science: Chief Chemist, USDA, William McMurtrie; inventor of Corningware, S. Donald Stookey; MacArthur Fellow and professor of psychiatry; Jay Weiss; Leidy Klotz, professor and author

In sports: Five members of The College Football Hall of Fame, eight NFL players, seven professional baseball players, and an Olympic gold medalist, including two-time World Series champion Joe Maddon (2002, 2016); and Charlie Berry Jr, who played for the Boston Red Sox and Philadelphia Athletics and is the only person to officiate an NFL Championship, World Series, and College All-star game in the same year.

Notable faculty 

 Eugene C. Bingham, former chemistry department head, pioneer in rheology theory
 John Franklin Bruce Carruthers, former head of the Bible department, reverend to early aviators
 Lyman Coleman, former chair of ancient languages, scholar of religion
 Guy Consolmagno, assistant professor, physics and astronomy
 Thomas Messinger Drown, former professor of chemical engineering, analytical chemist and metallurgist
 Clement Eaton, Chair of History Department, 1931–1942
 Terry Jonathan Hart, visiting lecturer of engineering
 Robert Higgs, former professor of economics, known for his ratchet effect theory
 Caspar Wistar Hodge, Jr., former professor of religion, theological scholar
 George Junkin, first and third president of Lafayette College
 Ed Kerns, former head of the art department, known for his contributions to Abstract expressionism
 Chawne Kimber, mathematician and quilter
 William Sebring Kirkpatrick, former lecturer of municipal law, member of the United States House of Representatives
 Francis March, first professor of English Literature at any American college or university
 Donald L. Miller, writer and war historian
 Michael H. Moskow, former professor of economics, eighth president and CEO of the Federal Reserve Bank of Chicago
 Bruce Allen Murphy, Supreme Court Scholar
 Arnold A. Offner, historian of foreign policy, former president of the Society for Historians of American Foreign Relations
 Alix Ohlin, Canadian novelist, associate professor of English
 Thomas Conrad Porter, former professor of botany and zoology
 Theodore Roethke, poet
 Len Roberts, former professor of English, Fulbright scholar and fellow of the National Endowment for the Humanities
 Anna Rubin, former professor of music, composer
 Rosemarie Tong, former professor of philosophy, known for her contributions to bioethics and health care reform
 Lee Upton, poet, writer in residence, professor of English
 Laura Walls, former professor of English, researcher of American Transcendentalism
 Hana Wirth-Nesher, former professor of English, American-Israeli literary scholar

Notable coaches 
 George Barclay, head football coach (1908); inventor of the football helmet
 Butch van Breda Kolff, head men's basketball coach (1952–1956)
 Tom Davis, head men's basketball coach (1971–1977)
 Tim Lenahan, head men's soccer coach (1998–2000)
 Herb McCracken, head football coach (1924–1935)
 Tim Murphy, assistant football coach (1981)
 Edward Mylin, head football coach (1937–1942, 1946)
 Steve Spagnuolo, assistant football coach, (1984–1986)
 Jock Sutherland, head football coach (1919–1923)
 Gary Williams, head men's soccer coach and assistant men's basketball coach (1972–1977)
 Hal Wissel, head men's basketball coach (1967–1971)

References

External links 

 
 Official athletics website

 
Easton, Pennsylvania
Eastern Pennsylvania Rugby Union
Educational institutions established in 1826
Patriot League
Universities and colleges in Northampton County, Pennsylvania
1826 establishments in Pennsylvania
Liberal arts colleges in Pennsylvania
Gilbert du Motier, Marquis de Lafayette
Private universities and colleges in Pennsylvania